Apenes is a genus of ground beetles in the family Carabidae. There are at least 80 described species in Apenes.

Species
These 86 species belong to the genus Apenes:

 Apenes aenea (Dejean, 1831)
 Apenes aeneipennis (Chaudoir, 1852)
 Apenes aerea Steinheil, 1875
 Apenes amplicollis Bates, 1891
 Apenes angustata Schwarz, 1878
 Apenes apiceguttata Chaudoir, 1875
 Apenes aptera Darlington, 1936
 Apenes bonariensis Liebke, 1939
 Apenes brevivittis Chaudoir, 1875
 Apenes calligramma Bates, 1884
 Apenes cayennensis (Buquet, 1835)
 Apenes chalumeaui Ball & Shpeley, 1992
 Apenes circumcincta Chaudoir, 1875
 Apenes comis Bates, 1878
 Apenes coriacea (Chevrolat, 1863)
 Apenes cuprascens Chaudoir, 1875
 Apenes darlingtoni Ball & Shpeley, 1992
 Apenes davidsoni Ball & Shpeley, 2009
 Apenes delicata Darlington, 1934
 Apenes dilutiventris Chaudoir, 1875
 Apenes dominica Ball & Shpeley, 1992
 Apenes ehrhardti (Liebke, 1939)
 Apenes erythrodera Chaudoir, 1875
 Apenes faber Ball & Shpeley, 2009
 Apenes farri Ball & Shpeley, 1992
 Apenes fasciata Chaudoir, 1875
 Apenes hamigera (Chaudoir, 1875)
 Apenes hilariola Bates, 1891
 Apenes iviei Ball & Shpeley, 1992
 Apenes kathleenae Ball & Shpeley, 1992
 Apenes lachauxi Ball & Shpeley, 2009
 Apenes laevicincta Darlington, 1934
 Apenes laevis Liebke, 1939
 Apenes lata Darlington, 1934
 Apenes lepidula Darlington, 1934
 Apenes limbata G. Horn, 1895
 Apenes lucia Ball & Shpeley, 2009
 Apenes lucidula (Dejean, 1831)
 Apenes lunigera Chaudoir, 1875
 Apenes lunulata Chaudoir, 1875
 Apenes maculata (Gory, 1833)
 Apenes marginalis (Dejean, 1831)
 Apenes mazoreoides Chaudoir, 1875
 Apenes morio (Dejean, 1825)
 Apenes nebulosa LeConte, 1867
 Apenes nevermanni Liebke, 1939
 Apenes obscura Chaudoir, 1875
 Apenes octoguttulata Motschulsky, 1864
 Apenes omostigma (Motschulsky, 1864)
 Apenes opaca LeConte, 1851
 Apenes ovalis Darlington, 1936
 Apenes ovipennis Liebke, 1936
 Apenes pallidipes (Chevrolat, 1836)
 Apenes pallipes (Fabricius, 1792)
 Apenes parallela (Dejean, 1825)
 Apenes parvula (Chaudoir, 1875)
 Apenes pauliana Liebke, 1939
 Apenes pecki Ball & Shpeley, 2009
 Apenes peryphoides Bates, 1883
 Apenes philipi Ball & Shpeley, 2009
 Apenes plaumanni (Liebke, 1939)
 Apenes portoricensis Darlington, 1939
 Apenes postica (Dejean, 1831)
 Apenes prasina Ball & Shpeley, 1992
 Apenes purpurata Fleutiaux & Sallé, 1890
 Apenes purpuripennis Chaudoir, 1875
 Apenes quadripennis (Chaudoir, 1875)
 Apenes quadripunctata (Reiche, 1842)
 Apenes rawlinsi Ball & Shpeley, 2009
 Apenes sallei (Chaudoir, 1875)
 Apenes scobifer Darlington, 1934
 Apenes sculpticeps Ball & Shpeley, 2009
 Apenes seriata (Motschulsky, 1864)
 Apenes simoni Liebke, 1935
 Apenes sinuata (Say, 1823)
 Apenes steinheili Ball & Shpeley, 1992
 Apenes stigmata Liebke, 1939
 Apenes strandi Liebke, 1939
 Apenes sulcicollis (Jacquelin du Val, 1857)
 Apenes thomasi Ball & Shpeley, 2009
 Apenes toussainti Ball & Shpeley, 2009
 Apenes umbrosa Csiki, 1932
 Apenes variegata (Dejean, 1825)
 Apenes vianai Liebke, 1939
 Apenes xanthopleura Chaudoir, 1875
 Apenes youngi Ball & Shpeley, 2009

References

External links

 

Harpalinae